Ascot railway station serves the town of Ascot in Berkshire, England. The station, and all trains serving it, are operated by South Western Railway. It is at the junction of the Waterloo to Reading line with the Ascot to Guildford line.

The station has three active platforms. The London-bound track is a single track with platform faces on either side, both of which are called Platform 1. Until some time prior to 2008, both faces could be used to board London-bound trains, but now only the doors on the ticket office side of the train open with the other side now being fenced off. Platform 2 serves the -bound line, and Platform 3 serves the  line for trains starting and terminating their journeys at Ascot. Where trains are running from London through to Guildford, or vice versa, they use Platform 2. All lines are bi-directional.

History
The Staines, Wokingham and Woking Junction Railway opened the station when it reached Ascot on 4 June 1856. On 18 March 1878 Ascot became a junction when the line towards  was opened. Later the London and South Western Railway took over the SWWJR. In the Grouping of 1923 the L&SWR became part of the Southern Railway, which electrified both lines using a third rail system on 1 January 1939. Under nationalisation in 1948 Ascot station became part of the Southern Region of British Railways.

The L&SWR opened Ascot Race Course Platform or Ascot West in 1922 to serve Ascot Racecourse. BR closed it in 1965.

Ascot had four signal boxes until the 1960s – "A" and "B" boxes controlled the main station, West box controlled the racecourse station and "Drake & Mount's Siding" the carriage sidings east of the station.

When BR sectorised itself in the 1980s, the station was made part of Network SouthEast.

In 1982 a fire severely damaged the station buildings on the "up" (London-bound) side.

Services
Trains to Aldershot operate every 30 minutes Monday to Saturday and every 60 minutes on Sundays (to Guildford). Most of these trains start or terminate at Ascot, but there are through trains from London Waterloo to Aldershot during Monday to Friday peak periods.

During Royal Ascot week, train services from London Waterloo to Reading through Ascot are significantly increased, with trains running every 15 mins in either direction.

Notes

References

External links

 
 Station on navigable Ordnance Survey map

Railway stations in Berkshire
DfT Category C2 stations
Former London and South Western Railway stations
Railway stations in Great Britain opened in 1856
Railway stations served by South Western Railway
Sunninghill and Ascot